The 1909 Boston Red Sox season was the ninth season in the franchise's Major League Baseball history. The Red Sox finished third in the American League (AL) with a record of 88 wins and 63 losses,  games behind the Detroit Tigers. The team played its home games at Huntington Avenue Grounds.

Offseason 
 February 16, 1909: Cy Young was traded to the Cleveland Naps in exchange for pitchers Jack Ryan and Charlie Chech, and $12,500.
 March: The team held spring training in Hot Springs, Arkansas.

Regular season 
 April 12: The regular season opens with an 8–1 loss to the Philadelphia Athletics at Shibe Park in Philadelphia.
 April 16: Harry Hooper makes his major league debut.
 April 21: In the home opener, Boston defeats Philadelphia, 6–2.
 May 31: The team's longest losing streak of the season, six games, ends with a road win over Philadelphia.
 August 19: The team's longest winning streak of the season, 11 games, ends with a loss to the New York Highlanders at Hilltop Park in New York City.
 October 5: The regular season ends with home doubleheader against New York; Boston loses the first game, 6–5, then wins the second game, 6–1.
The team's longest game of the season was 12 innings, which occurred three times.

Statistical leaders
The offense was led by Tris Speaker, who hit seven home runs and had 77 RBIs while recording a .309 batting average. The pitching staff was led by Frank Arellanes with 16 wins, Eddie Cicotte with a 1.94 ERA, and Smoky Joe Wood with 88 strikeouts.

Season standings 

The team had one game end in a tie; August 25 at Chicago White Sox. Tie games are not counted in league standings, but player statistics during tie games are counted.

Record vs. opponents

Opening Day lineup 

Source:

Roster

Player stats

Batting

Starters by position 
Note: Pos = Position; G = Games played; AB = At bats; H = Hits; Avg. = Batting average; HR = Home runs; RBI = Runs batted in

Other batters 
Note: G = Games played; AB = At Bats; H = Hits; Avg. = Batting average; HR = Home runs; RBI = Runs batted in

Pitching

Starting pitchers 
Note: G = Games pitched; IP = Innings pitched; W = Wins; L = Losses; ERA = Earned run average; SO = Strikeouts

Other pitchers 
Note: G = Games pitched; IP = Innings pitched; W = Wins; L = Losses; ERA = Earned run average; SO = Strikeouts

Relief pitchers 
''Note: G = Games pitched; W = Wins; L = Losses; SV = Saves; ERA = Earned run average; SO = Strikeouts

References

External links 
1909 Boston Red Sox team page at Baseball Reference
1909 Boston Red Sox season at baseball-almanac.com

Boston Red Sox seasons
Boston Red Sox
Boston Red Sox
1900s in Boston